SAN (legally Servicios Aéreos Nacionales S.A.) was an airline which was based in Guayaquil, Ecuador that was the domestic branch of the airline SAETA. It was founded in 1964, and ceased operations in 1999.

History

SAN was founded on January 21, 1964, providing commercial services within Ecuador with two Douglas C-47As. the first routes directly connected Cuenca with Guayaquil in passenger transport operations in 1966, these operations were daily.

In 1970, the company signed an alliance with Ecuatoriana de Aviación. That same year, SAN acquired two Vickers Viscount from All Nippon Airways. Its arrival in Ecuador and entry into service marked a decided modernization of the flight equipment, which allowed the company to continue operating its usual routes and inaugurate direct flights from Cuenca to Quito and for the routes to Guayaquil to be operated with its own teams.

In 1975, three Sud Aviation Caravelle were acquired from TAP Air Portugal, two of them are put into service on the frequencies assigned between the cities of Quito and Guayaquil and one was stored in Cuenca for to serve as a source of spare parts. SAN's intention was to operate with the Caravelles to and from Cuenca, but this was not authorized by the aeronautical authorities of that time.

In 1979, SAN purchased two Sud Caravelles from Luxair, one was used in service and the other for spare parts. In this period, the Cuenca investors who had a majority decided to sell their shares to a Guayaquil businessman. By 1981, two Boeing 727-100s were incorporated, which one maintained its fleet and the other one was sold to TAME.

In the early 1990's, SAN was absorbed by Ecuadorian airline SAETA, increasing its frequencies and fleet for national and international flights. But the next years were of absolute decline until in 1999, when the company definitively ceased operations.

Destinations

Cuenca (Mariscal Lamar International Airport)
Esmeraldas (Colonel Carlos Concha Torres Airport)
Guayaquil (José Joaquín de Olmedo International Airport) Hub
Macas (Edmundo Carvajal Airport)
Manta (Eloy Alfaro International Airport)
Quito (Old Mariscal Sucre International Airport)
San Cristóbal Island (San Cristóbal Airport)

Miami (Miami International Airport)

Fleet
SAN had operated the following aircraft:

Accidents and incidents
On September 4, 1977, a Vickers Viscount (registered HC-BCL) crashed into a mountain in the Cajas Mountains, killing all 33 people on board.

On December 29, 1977, a Vickers Viscount (registered HC-BEM) crashed into a hill near Cuenca. All 24 people on board were killed.

On October 8, 1982, a Vickers Viscount (registered HC-ATV) was damaged beyond repairs after a runway excursion at Mariscal Lamar International Airport in Cuenca.

On April 29, 1983, a Sud Aviation Caravelle (registered HC-BAJ) crashed shortly after taking off from José Joaquín de Olmedo International Airport due to a double engine failure. 8 of the 100 people on board were killed in the accident.

References

External links

Fleet list of SAN
SAN incidents at the Aviation Safety Network

Defunct airlines of Ecuador
Airlines established in 1964
Airlines disestablished in 1999
Defunct companies of Ecuador
1964 establishments in Ecuador
1990s disestablishments in Ecuador